Supper at Emmaus or The Pilgrims at Emmaus is a 1648 oil on mahogany panel painting by Rembrandt. It was sold at the sale of the collection of Willem Six on 12 May 1734 in Amsterdam and then at three Paris sales before finally being acquired for the French royal collection in 1777 at a fourth sale. It is now in the Louvre in Paris.

References

Paintings by Rembrandt
1648 paintings
Paintings in the Louvre by Dutch, Flemish and German artists
Rembrandt